Mick Dalla-Vee is a Canadian singer, songwriter, producer, engineer, multi-instrumentalist.

Early days
He moved to Western Canada, after leaving Bawating High School from Sault Ste. Marie, Ontario, with the band Shama. Shama toured Western Canada and was managed by Bruce Allen (Bryan Adams, Martina McBride) before disbanding. From that point he became the lead guitarist of Trama, managed by Sam Feldman (Joni Mitchell, Diana Krall), then on to playing bass for the band Paradox which evolved into his current band Cease & Desist. Cease & Desist has been described as "one of Vancouver's most popular club bands" by the rock music critic of The Province.

He also played the part of John in a Beatles cover band, Revolver, that was put together for Expo 86, and played occasionally throughout the subsequent decade.

Songwriting
Mick has written or co-written many songs on albums for artists as diverse as country music's Brent Howard and Canada's Singing Cowgirl: Marilyn Faye Parney, the heavy rock sounds of Blackstone (released on the Delinquent label in Canada), the soul/R&B sounds of 'j.c. neill', Belinda Metz and new singing sensation 'Emily Jordan' to the 'smooth jazz' sounds of internationally acclaimed Lori Paul. He co-wrote ten of the eleven songs on Paul's album Vanity Press. His first country song 'The Wrangler' reached the country top 30 charts right across Canada. It also achieved 'Heavy Rotation' on C.M.T., Canada's country music video channel. One of the songs from Mick's 'A Whistler Christmas' album entitled, 'All I Want is You at Christmastime' has been recorded and released by Canadian country star, Brent Howard and has also been sent to be recorded by 'Art Garfunkel' for a compilation Christmas album due in the not too distant future. He has also written music for movies, television, videos, video games and promotional spots. His writing styles run the gamut from 'Smooth Jazz' to 'Heavy Thrash'.
(A Whistler Christmas and Dalla-Vee's original Christmas songs are often heard on Canadian radio during their Christmas music programming.)

Producing
Aside from producing himself in an array of projects such as 1994's A Whistler Christmas album, he runs his own studio 'Millennia Sound Design', producing and engineering for artists like: Randy Bachman, Emily Jordan, jcneill, Lori Paul, Hello Beautiful amongst others. He has ongoing contracts with The National Braille Factory, and has provided theme music and soundscapes for two network television series and Simon Fraser University. Randy Bachman's new CD "Jazzthing"  had some work done on it at "Millennia Sound Design".

Vocals
Dalla-Vee has contributed to projects as diverse as, the multi platinum heavy rock of the "Mötley Crüe" album "A Decade of Decadence" to the country/rockabilly sounds of Brent Howard and Southern Cherry to Colin Arthur Wiebe. Canadian legends, Trooper and The Powder Blues Band have also used Mick's voice for recordings. He has worked extensively as a studio session singer/musician, with his talent of many voices being used on a worldwide 'Karaoke' album package marketed over the dreaded U.S. infomercial. He has sung a number of commercial jingles for radio and television.

Awards
Having recorded with a host of other Canadian and international recording acts such as Randy Bachman (of the band The Guess Who and Bachman Turner Overdrive), Mick was awarded a 'Gold Record' for his work on the 'Trooper' album 'Last of the Gypsies' in 1991. In 2011-2012 Mick received first a Gold Status award then a Platinum status award for The Live DVD: Bachman & Turner Live at The Roseland Ballroom in New York City. The guest performer with the band for that show and DVD was Paul Shaffer of The Late Show with David Letterman.

Mick also earned a Platinum status for the DVD ‘Randy Bachman’s Vinyl Tap’ which was filmed during the cross Canada tour of the show by the same name. Mick is the featured vocalist as well as bass player in Randy's live band.

In 1997, he received the Saskatchewan Album of the Year Award for his song writing/musician contributions to an album with proceeds going to people affected with multiple sclerosis.

Live
He keeps an extremely steady schedule playing guitar, bass and keyboards with his main band, Cease and Desist, and its new show "Atlantic Crossing". He is the bass player/vocalist with Canadian Rock Legend, Randy Bachman's band.

Bachman’s 2003 - 2007 foray in the jazz world with his CD's, ‘Jazz Thing (1 & 2)’ features Dalla-Vee on the ‘upright bass’ and vocals.

He plays mandolin, banjo, acoustic guitars and harmonica in the Brent Howard and Southern Cherry band, and has toured as John Lennon in 'Revolver - The Worlds Best Beatles Show'. Mick also appears as 'Elton John' in the hit show, Elton and Billy: Live.

Dalla-Vee played keyboards with the R&B Grammy Award winning sensation, Melanie Fiona.

Affiliations
A longtime member of the Canadian Academy of Recording Arts and Sciences, he has sat on the panel as a judge for Canada's Juno Awards (Canada's Version of The Grammy's). He was on the board of directors of the Pacific Music Industry Association for 3 years, and is also chair of The Carolyn Foundation Musician's Assistance Society; a non-profit organization he and colleagues set-up in the wake of his daughter Carolyn's sudden death in November 1999.

References

External links
Cease & Desist
Mick Dalla-Vee official website

Year of birth missing (living people)
Living people
Canadian rock musicians